The Australian Women's Rugby League is the governing body of female rugby league in Australia and other parts of Oceania and was established in 1993. It currently falls under the Australian Rugby League Commission which oversees its running and management but it took the association five years to be recognized by the Australian Rugby League.

The AWRL is run at state level by its own governing organizations in the Queensland Women's Rugby League, New South Wales Women's Rugby League, Canberra Women's Rugby League and the Western Australian Women's Rugby League. The main women's competitions in Australia are the Sydney Metro. Women's Rugby League and the QWRL and Brisbane and District Women's Rugby League.

At international level the Women's Australian side is commonly referred to as the Australian Jillaroos.

Since 1995 the AWRL has staged international fixtures against other women rugby league countries.

1995 Australia vs New Zealand 2 Test Series
1996 Australia vs Great Britain 3 Test Series
1997 Australia vs New Zealand 2 Test Series
1998 Australia vs Fiji 2 Test Series
1999 Australia vs New Zealand 3 test series
2000 1st Women's RL World Cup staged in Great Britain
2001 Australia vs New Zealand test match
2002 Australia vs Great Britain 3 test series
2003 Australia vs New Zealand Maoris
2nd Women's RL World Cup staged in New Zealand
2004 Australia vs New Zealand 2 test series
2005 Australian u21s vs Auckland u21s in Auckland

AWRL National Championships
1998 - Queensland
1999 - Canberra
2008 - South East Queensland

See also

Women's rugby league in Australia
NRL Women's – the official league for women's rugby league in Australia starting in 2018

References

External links
 

 
   
1993 establishments in Australia
Sports organizations established in 1993